Potti Sriramulu Chalavadi Mallikarjunarao College of Engineering & Technology is an engineering college located in the Krishna District of Andhra Pradesh, India. The college is located in the centre of Vijayawada. The college is affiliated with Jawaharlal Nehru Technological University, Kakinada and is approved by the All India Council for Technical Education, New Delhi.

Introduction 
The college is located in the commercial district of Vijayawada on a ten-acre campus. The academic complex includes: faculty offices, theatre style and classic lecture halls, an indoor stadium, an auditorium, and a library. There are laboratories for computer studies, communication skills, electronics, internet technology and an electrical workshop.

Management 
PSCMRCET is a private sector, not for profit institute which is governed by a group of philanthropists from the business community of Vijayawada and surrounds.

SKPVV Hindu high schools' committee 
The group was founded in 1906. The members contributed funds and raised donations from like minded people to build a primary school to provide education for the children of the poor. The committee was registered with the Registrar of Krishna District in 1911. As the number of contributors increased, more schools and colleges were opened. The proper governance of the committee and consistency of its mission values are given priority.

Schools 
 Sri Kanyaka Parameswari Vissamsetty Venkataratnam Hindu High School, Kothapet (1906)
 Sri Kanyaka Parameswari Vissamsetty Venkataratnam Hindu High School, Gandhinagar (1917)
 Kakarparthi Bhavanarayana College, Kothapet (1965) 
 Sri Sriram Bhimasankara Rao Kanakaratnamma Girls School, Gandhinagar (1972).
 Maddi Subba Rao English Medium High School, Kothapet (1991).
 Sri Kanyaka Parameswari Vissamsetty Venkataratnam Hindu Mahila Junior College, Kothapet (1994).
 Kakarparthi Bhavanarayana Post Graduate College, Kothapet (2001)
 Kakarparthi Bhavanarayana Post Graduate Centre, Kothapet (2003)
 Sri Raja Surapaneni Venkata Papaiah Rao College of Education, Gandhinagar (2006).
 Potti Sriramulu Chalavadi Mallikharjunarao College of Engineering and Technology (2008)

Courses Offered 
The college offers a graduate course in engineering and a masters course in business administration. There are also undergraduate courses.

Computer Science and Engineering 
The Department of Computer Science and Engineering (founded 2008) is fondly called "Team CSE" by students. It enrolls 120 students. The department aims are to heighten technological awareness; train future industry specialists; provide consultancy and involve students in research and development. The head of department is Dr. R. Chandrasekharam. The department has a student association known as ACCESS, an acronym for "Achievers' Community for Computer Engineering and Scientific Study".

Research and development 
A computer laboratory of 30 systems and 2 servers, with software such as Microsoft Developer Network (MSDN) is established for R&D. The department facilitates "live" student projects from IBM. Oracle Academy is established and negotiations for Microsoft certification center is in progress in addition with R&D establishments.

Department of Electronics & Communication Engineering 
The department has a microprocessors & interfacing lab, an electronic devices and circuits lab, an  analog and digital communication lab, a power electronics lab and an advanced communication lab.
The head of department is Professor Seshagiri Rao. The student association of the "ECE" is known as "SPAECE".The present intake of the department is 120 students.

Department of Electrical & Electronics Engineering 
The electrical and electronics engineering department was founded with a threefold mission in teaching, research, and public service. The head of department is Prof.Y.V.Balaramakrishnarao, Ph.D. The student association is called "VIDYUT". The present intake of the department is 60 students.

Department of Management Studies 
The department aims to teach students the skills to allow them to contribute to management in public and private domains in India. The head of the department is Dr.V.Vijay Durga Prasad, MBA, Ph.D. The intake of the department is 180 students.

Department of Science and Humanities 
The science and humainites department teaches English, mathematics, engineering physics, engineering chemistry and environmental science.

Training & Placements 
The college is registered under the " Jawahar Knowledge Center" (JKC). Students will look for work in Indian IT companies such as Syntel. Students with masters of business management  or bachelor of technology have been placed with companies such as HDFC Bank, Adithya Software Solutions, VisionTek, HCL Technologies and Muthoot Finance.

Events 
On 25 September the CSE and IT departments jointly ran "ILLUMINATI-2K9", the college's inaugural national level technical symposium. On 4 October 2009, the ECE department hosted "GENISPAR-2K9" the college's inaurural, national level paper presentation. The college considered both events successful. The college also organises an annual educational festival called "Jignasa" (curiosity to learn).

External links 
 
 College Profile: POTTI SRIRAMULU COLLEGE OF ENGG AND TECHNOLOGY

References 

Educational institutions established in 2008
Engineering colleges in Vijayawada
Engineering colleges in Krishna district
Engineering colleges in Andhra Pradesh
Engineering universities and colleges in India
2008 establishments in Andhra Pradesh